Luchino Visconti di Modrone, Count of Lonate Pozzolo (2 November 1906 – 17 March 1976) was an Italian filmmaker, stage director, and screenwriter. A major figure of Italian art and culture in the mid-20th century, Visconti was one of the fathers of cinematic neorealism, but later moved towards luxurious, sweeping epics dealing with themes of beauty, decadence, death, and European history, especially the decay of the nobility and the bourgeoisie.

He was the recipient of many accolades, including the Palme d'Or and the Golden Lion, and many of his works are regarded as highly-influential to future generations of filmmakers.

Born to a Milanese noble family, Visconti explored artistic proclivities from an early age, working as an assistant director to Jean Renoir. His 1943 directorial debut, Ossessione, was condemned by the Fascist regime for its unvarnished depictions of working-class characters resorting to criminality, but is today renowned as a pioneering work of Italian cinema. His best-known films include Senso (1954) and The Leopard (1963), both historical melodramas based on Italian literary classics, the gritty drama Rocco and His Brothers (1960), and his "German Trilogy" – The Damned (1969), Death in Venice (1971) and Ludwig (1973). He was also an accomplished stage director of plays and opera, both in Italy and abroad.

Early life

Luchino Visconti was born into a prominent noble family in Milan, one of seven children of Giuseppe Visconti di Modrone, Duke of Grazzano Visconti and Count of Lonate Pozzolo, and his wife Carla (née Erba, heiress to Erba Pharmaceuticals). He was formally known as Count don Luchino Visconti di Modrone, and his family is a branch of the Visconti of Milan where they ruled from 1277 to 1447, initially as lords, then as dukes.

He grew up in the Milanese family seat, the Palazzo Visconti di Modrone in Via Cerva, as well as on the family estate, Grazzano Visconti Castle near Vigolzone. He was baptized and raised in the Roman Catholic church. After his parents separated in the early 1920s, his mother moved with her younger children, including him, to her own house in Milan, as well as to her summer residence, Villa Erba in Cernobbio on Lake Como. The father, as chamberlain of King Victor Emmanuel III of Italy, also owned a villa in Rome that Luchino later inherited and lived in for decades.

In his early years, he was exposed to art, music and theatre: The Palazzo Visconti di Modrone in Milan, where he grew up, had its own small private theater and the children participated in its performances. The family also had their own box in the La Scala opera house. Luchino studied cello with the Italian cellist and composer Lorenzo de Paolis (1890–1965) and met the composer Giacomo Puccini, the conductor Arturo Toscanini and the writer Gabriele D'Annunzio. Visconti found literature by reading Proust's In Search of Lost Time, later a lifelong film project that he never realized. Before he started his film career, he was passionate about training racehorses in his own stable. An engagement concluded in 1935 with Princess Irma of Windisch-Graetz raised concerns with her father, Prince Hugo, whereupon Visconti broke it off.

Wartime resistance activity 
During World War II, Visconti joined the Italian Communist Party, which he considered to be the only effective opponent of Italian Fascism. While in his early years he had been impressed by such aesthetic aspects of the solemn parades of the National Fascist Party as marching in columns in boots and uniform, he had now come to hate the Mussolini regime. He accused the bourgeoisie of treason to tyranny, and following the Badoglio Proclamation, began working with the Italian resistance. He supported the communists' partisan fight at risk of death; his villa in Rome became a meeting place for oppositional artists.

After the king's flight in autumn 1943 and the intervention of the Germans, he went into hiding in the mountains, at Settefrati, under the nom de guerre Alfredo Guidi. Visconti helped English and American prisoners of war hide after they had escaped, and also gave shelter to partisans in his house in Rome, with the help of actress María Denis.

After the German occupation of Rome in April 1944, Visconti was arrested and detained by the anti-partisan Pietro Koch and sentenced to execution by firing squad. He was only saved from death by Denis' last-minute intervention. After the war, Visconti testified against Koch, who was himself convicted and executed.

Career

Films
He began his film-making career as a set dresser on Jean Renoir's Partie de campagne (1936) through the intercession of their common friend Coco Chanel. After a short tour of the United States, where he visited Hollywood, he returned to Italy to be Renoir's assistant again, this time for Tosca (1941), a production that was interrupted and later completed by German director Karl Koch.

Together with fellow members of the Milanese film journal Cinema - Gianni Puccini, Antonio Pietrangeli and Giuseppe De Santis - Visconti wrote the screenplay for his first film as director: Ossessione (Obsession, 1943), one of the first neorealist movies and an unofficial adaptation of the novel The Postman Always Rings Twice. The premiere of Ossessione took place at a film festival hosted by Vittorio Mussolini (son of Benito), who was the national arbitrator for cinema and other arts, and the editor of Cinema. Though prior to the premiere their working relationship was positive, upon viewing the film Vittorio stormed out of the theatre exclaiming: "This is not Italy!", according to the account of Cinema group contributor Aldo Scagnetti. The film was subsequently suppressed by the fascist regime, to the extent that the first public showing of the film in Rome only occurred in May 1945.

In 1948, he wrote and directed La terra trema (The Earth Trembles), based on the novel I Malavoglia by Giovanni Verga. 
Visconti continued working throughout the 1950s, but he veered away from the neorealist path with his 1954 film, Senso, shot in colour. Based on the novella by Camillo Boito, it is set in Austrian-occupied Venice in 1866. In this film, Visconti combines realism and romanticism as a way to break away from neorealism. However, as one biographer notes, "Visconti without neorealism is like Lang without expressionism and Eisenstein without formalism". He describes the film as the "most Viscontian" of all Visconti's films. Visconti returned to neorealism once more with Rocco e i suoi fratelli (Rocco and His Brothers, 1960), the story of Southern Italians who migrate to Milan hoping to find financial stability. In 1961, he was a member of the jury at the 2nd Moscow International Film Festival.

Throughout the 1960s, Visconti's films became more personal. Il Gattopardo (The Leopard, 1963) is based on Lampedusa's novel of the same name about the decline of the Sicilian aristocracy at the time of the Risorgimento, where the change of times becomes visible in two of the main characters: Don Fabrizio Corbera, Prince of Salina (Burt Lancaster) appears patriarchal but humane, while Don Calogero Sedara (Paolo Stoppa), a shrewd entrepreneur and social climber from the village, appears submissive, but foxy and brutal at the same time, a mafia-like type of the future. The tension arises from the marriage of their relatives of the next generation, combined with the fall of the old Bourbon rule and the rise of a united Italy. This film was distributed in America and Britain by Twentieth-Century Fox, which deleted important scenes. Visconti repudiated the Twentieth-Century Fox version.

It was not until The Damned (1969) that Visconti received a nomination for an Academy Award for Best Original Screenplay. The film, one of Visconti's better-known works, concerns a German industrialist's family which begins to disintegrate during the Nazi consolidation of power in the 1930s. The film opened to widespread critical acclaim, but also faced controversy from ratings boards for its sexual content, including depictions of homosexuality, pedophilia, rape, and incest. In the United States, the film was given an X rating. The avant-garde filmmaker Rainer Werner Fassbinder praised it as his favorite movie. Its decadence and lavish beauty are characteristic of Visconti's aesthetic − very visible also in the movie Death in Venice (1971) that processed the daring novella Death in Venice published in 1912 by Thomas Mann.

Visconti's final film was The Innocent (1976), in which he returns to his recurring interest in infidelity and betrayal.

Theatre

Visconti was also a celebrated theatre and opera director. During the years 1946 to 1960 he directed many performances of the Rina Morelli-Paolo Stoppa Company with actor Vittorio Gassman as well as many celebrated productions of operas.

Visconti's love of opera is evident in the 1954 Senso, where the beginning of the film shows scenes from the fourth act of Il trovatore, which were filmed at the Teatro La Fenice in Venice. Beginning when he directed a production at Milan's Teatro alla Scala of La vestale in December 1954, his career included a famous revival of La traviata at La Scala in 1955 with Maria Callas and an equally famous Anna Bolena (also at La Scala) in 1957 with Callas. A significant 1958 Royal Opera House (London) production of Verdi's five-act Italian version of Don Carlos (with Jon Vickers) followed, along with a Macbeth in Spoleto in 1958 and a famous black-and-white Il trovatore with scenery and costumes by Filippo Sanjust at the Royal Opera House in 1964. In 1966 Visconti's luscious Falstaff for the Vienna State Opera conducted by Leonard Bernstein was critically acclaimed. On the other hand, his austere 1969 Simon Boccanegra with the singers clothed in geometrical costumes provoked controversy.

Filmmaking style and themes 
In the aftermath of World War II he became one of the founding fathers of the Italian neorealistic film movement that focused on challenging economic and conditions, and how it affected the psyche of the underclass. Visconti himself came from nobility, highly educated and never in financial lack. His films reflected that tension. In fact Visconti said he felt he came from a world long ago, that of the previous (19th) century.

In the film The Leopard, he addressed the decline of an old social order and the rise of “modern times”. He did not see his opulent flashbacks as an escape into imaginary, lost worlds, rather as the deciphering of signs. He wanted to put his finger on the signs of profound historical changes which will only become visible later. He searched world literature for relevant works to show the discrepancies between generations and their world views, as a task of realism in art. When he was accused of decadence, he recalled Thomas Mann and his way of creating art.

Personal life 
In later years, Visconti made no secret of his homosexuality, though he remained a devout Catholic throughout his life. "I am a Catholic," he commented in 1971. "I was born a Catholic, I was baptized a Catholic. I cannot change what I am, I cannot easily become a Protestant. My ideas may be unorthodox, but I am still a Catholic." While his first 3-years-relationship from 1936, with the photographer 
Horst P. Horst, remained discreet because of the circumstances of the time, he later showed up openly in the company of his lovers, among them the director and producer Franco Zeffirelli and the actor Udo Kier. His last lover was the Austrian actor Helmut Berger, who played Martin in Visconti's film The Damned. Berger also appeared in Visconti's Ludwig in 1973 and Conversation Piece in 1974, along with Burt Lancaster. Zeffirelli also worked as part of the crew in production design, as assistant director, and other roles in a number of Visconti's films, operas, and theatrical productions. According to Visconti's autobiography, he and Umberto II of Italy had a romantic relationship during their youth in the 1920s.

Visconti was hostile to the Protests of 1968 and didn't even try to follow the movement and adopt the airs of a youth, like Alberto Moravia or Pier Paolo Pasolini did. In his view the protesters sought change for the sake of destruction without building something new. Disgusted, he looked at the young people in their enthusiasm, outbursts of anger, parties and tumults, their abstract speeches, their confused juggling with Mao, Marx and Che Guevara. They saw him as a symbol of reaction, a member of the mandarin caste. The emerging radical-left terrorism in Italy frightened him and made him fear the rise of a new fascism.

Health issues and death 

Visconti smoked 120 cigarettes a day. He suffered a heavy stroke in 1972, but continued to smoke heavily. He died in Rome of another stroke at the age of sixty-nine on 17 March 1976. There is a museum dedicated to the director's work in Ischia where he had his summer residence La Colombaia.

Work

Filmography

Feature films

Other films
 , documentary, 1945
 Appunti su un fatto di cronaca, short film, 1951
 Siamo donne (We, the Women), 1953, episode Anna Magnani
 Boccaccio '70, 1962, based on the episode Il lavoro in Boccaccio's Decameron
 Le streghe (The Witches), 1967, episode La strega bruciata viva
 , TV movie, 1970

Opera

References
Notes

Sources
 Ardoin, John, The Callas Legacy, London: Duckworth, 1977  
 Bacon, Henry, Visconti: Explorations of Beauty and Decay, New York: Cambridge University Press, 1998 
 Düttmann, Alexander García, Visconti: Insights into Flesh and Blood, translated by Robert Savage, Stanford: Stanford University Press, 2009 
 Glasenapp, Jörg (ed.): Luchino Visconti (= Film-Konzepte, vol. 48). Munich: edition text + kritik 2017.
 Iannello, Silvia, Le immagini e le parole dei Malavoglia Roma: Sovera, 2008 (in Italian)
 Nowell-Smith, Geoffrey, Luchino Visconti. London: British Film Institute, 2003. 
 Visconti bibliography, University of California Library, Berkeley. Retrieved 7 November 2011.
 Schifano, Laurence: Luchino Visconti (biography, in French), Paris 1987 (German translation: Luchino Visconti, Fürst des Films, Gernsbach 1988)
 Viscontiana: Luchino Visconti e il melodramma verdiano, Milan: Edizioni Gabriele Mazzotta, 2001. A catalog for an exhibition in Parma of artifacts relating to Visconti's productions of operas by Verdi, curated by Caterina d'Amico de Carvalho, in Italian.

External links

Biography, Filmography and More on Luchino Visconti 
British Film Institute: "Luchino Visconti": filmography
Hutchison, Alexander, "Luchino Visconti's Death in Venice", Literature/Film Quarterly, v. 2, 1974. (In-Depth Analysis of Death in Venice).

1906 births
1976 deaths
Bisexual men
Bisexual artists
Directors of Palme d'Or winners
Directors of Golden Lion winners
Giallo film directors
Luchino 2
Italian nobility
Italian film directors
Italian communists
Italian Marxists
Italian Roman Catholics
Italian opera directors
Italian male screenwriters
Bisexual screenwriters
LGBT Roman Catholics
LGBT theatre directors
Italian LGBT screenwriters
David di Donatello winners
Nastro d'Argento winners
Theatre people from Milan
LGBT film directors